Karşıyaka, formerly Verâ-yı Cisr, is a quarter in the Yüreğir district of the city of Adana. The quarter is on the banks of Seyhan river, just across the old town.

Settled in early 19th century, Karşıyaka is the first expansion of Adana to the east bank of Seyhan River. During the Egyptian rule of Adana (1833-1840), neighborhood was founded for the Alawites that had migrated from Syria.  It is bordered by D400 state road on the north, Seyhan river on the west and Yüreğir Canal on the east. Yüreğir District Hall, Adana State Hospital and Asri Cemetery are located in this zone.

Etymology
Karşıyaka name meaning 'the other side', is named for the area after the foundation of the republic, as the area stood at the other side of the old town. The original name of the quarter, Verâ-yı Cisr, is in Ottoman Turkish meaning 'beyond the bridge'.

Governance
The quarter of Karşıyaka, is an area of the city, not a level of government. The quarter is made up of 14 neighbourhoods and each neighbourhood is administered by the Muhtar and the Seniors Council. The neighborhoods of Karşıyaka are; Cumhuriyet, Yamaçlı, Seyhan, Haydaroğlu, Bahçelievler, Akdeniz, Güneşli, Anadolu, Dede Korkut, Yunus Emre, 19 Mayıs, Yeşilbağlar, Koza and Başak.

Demographics
The population of Karşıyaka as of December, 2014 is 104,040. Traditionally an Arabic area, Karşıyaka has seen mass migration of Kurds during 1990s.

Culture
Ramazanoğlu Cultural Center, is the cultural complex of Karşıyaka, founded by the Ministry of Culture and Tourism. The centre has a theatre hall, library and two exhibition halls. Adana Town Theatre performs regularly at the centre.

Sports
Adana Karşıyaka SK is the football club of Karşıyaka, performing at the First Division of the Adana Amateur League. The venue of the club is the Akdeniz Stadium.

Peyami Safa Maracı Stadium, located at the shores of Seyhan river is the other stadium located in the quarter.

Transport
The metro station of Karşıyaka is Cumhuriyet Station, at the intersection of Karataş Road and the Regülatör Bridge.

Adana Metropolitan Municipality Bus Department (ABBO) has bus routes from downtown Adana to neighbourhoods of Karşıyaka. Minibuses to Karataş depart from Karşıyaka.

References

Neighborhoods/Settlements in Adana